The State University of Campinas Institute of Biology is a research and higher education institution located at UNICAMP's main campus in the district of Barão Geraldo in Campinas, São Paulo, Brazil.

Undergraduate programs
 Bachelor's Degree in Biological Sciences
 Teaching Degree in Biological Sciences

Graduate programs
 Cellular and Structural Biology
 Veterinary Medicine
 Ecology
 Functional and Molecular Biology
 Genetics and Molecular Biology
 Plant Biology
 Parasitology

Interdepartmental Complementary Units
 Herbarium
 Zoology Museum
 Electron Microscope Laboratory

Address
Instituto de Biologia
Rua Monteiro Lobato - n° 255
Unicamp - Cidade Universitária Zeferino Vaz
Campinas - 13083-970
Brazil

External links
 Official site
 - Programs of University of Campinas

University of Campinas